The Archaeology of Hindu Ritual: Temples and the Establishment of the Gods is an archaeological study focusing on the early development of Hinduism within the Gupta Empire between the 4th and 6th centuries CE. Written by the British archaeologist Michael D. Willis, curator of the South Asian and Himalayan collection at the British Museum, it was published by Cambridge University Press in 2009.

The first major archaeological study to deal with the origins of Hinduism, The Archaeology of Hindu Ritual takes an interdisciplinary approach to the subject, making use of epigraphy, iconology and ethnography. The first chapter, "The Archaeology and Politics of Time at Udayagiri", pays particular attention to the ritual site at the Udayagiri Caves in Madhya Pradesh. The second, "Establishment of the Gods", looks at the development of temples and puja in India.

Willis' book was positively reviewed in various peer reviewed academic journals, such as South Asian Studies and the Religious Studies Review, as well as in popular Indian newspaper The Hindu. Critics described it as a groundbreaking study and praised its use of a variety of different forms of evidence, but some argued that it neglected to properly discuss the relationship between Hindu ritual and the religious practices of Buddhist and Jainist communities in Gupta India.

Background

Willis was born in Vancouver, British Columbia, Canada, and raised in Kuwait and Saudi Arabia, before taking his B.A. degree at the University of Victoria where he studied with Siri Gunasinghe and Alan Gowans. Travelling to the University of Chicago, he studied with J. A. B. van Buitenen and Pramod Chandra, receiving his doctoral degree in 1988 after periods in India and Cyprus. He taught at SUNY New Paltz before joining the British Museum in 1994.

A Fellow of the Royal Asiatic Society and an Honorary Research Fellow at Cardiff University, at the time of the book's publication, Willis was the curator of the early South Asian and Himalayan collections at the British Museum in central London.

Willis had previously published several academic papers on the subject of early Hindu ritual and the Udayagiri Caves, including a paper entitled "The Archaeology and Politics of Time" in an anthology entitled The Vākāṭaka Heritage: Indian Culture at the Crossroads (2004), edited by Hans T. Bakker.

Synopsis

Willis opens the book with a discussion of the early Hindu ritual site at the Udayagiri Caves, a place that had ancient origins but which was reworked under the administration of the Gupta Emperor Candragupta II. He highlights the relationship that Candragupta II had with the Hindu god Viṣṇu before moving on to a discussion of his methodology. Noting that he takes an interdisciplinary approach that combines archaeological and historical evidence, he critiques earlier text-based historical approaches to studying the development of early Hinduism before returning to a discussion of Udayagiri. Willis closes his introduction by reiterating his belief that in Indian history, it was religion that drove economic and political relationships rather than the other way round.

Chapter one, "The Archaeology and Politics of Time at Udayagiri", goes into greater depth regarding the archaeological site at the Udayagiri Caves, highlighting the fact that it served as a centre for "imperial ritual" during the Gupta period. Willis begins by describing the central ridge and passage at the site, before offering a synopsis of astronomical phenomenon and how it pertained to the Udayagiri site. He then discusses various sculptures at the site, such as that of Narasiṃha and of Varāha, two avatars of Viṣṇu.

The second chapter, entitled "The Establishment of the Gods",

Chapter three, "Ritual Action and Ritual Actors",

Arguments

Reception

Academic reviews

The Archaeology of Hindu Ritual was positively reviewed by Leslie C. Orr of Concordia University, Montreal in the journal South Asian Studies. Describing it as "extraordinarily ambitious and exciting", she did however take issue with some of Willis' statements, believing them to be erroneous. In particular, she argues that Willis has painted an incorrect picture with regards to the relationship between Hinduism and the heterodox Jain and Buddhist faiths, neglecting to refer to the many similarities between them. She also takes issue with Willis' trend to pick fights with "straw men", opining that these criticisms of his "seem out of place in a book of such grand scope and reach."

John E. Cort of Denison University, Ohio reviewed the book for the Religious Studies Review. Describing the "densely argued" book, Cort noted that in ignoring Jain and Buddhist iconography and temples, Willis had failed to encompass the same scope which he professes. Ultimately, Cort considered it to be an "essential" study for all of those interested in "medieval Indic temple religion."

In a review published in the Durham Anthropological Review, Vittorio Magnano of Durham University, North East England stated that Willis had provided a "meticulous analysis" of the available evidence in producing his study, ultimately describing it as "inspiring reading". Believing that Willis had followed a "line of reasoning with determination", he noted that his study still left room for the reader to come to their own decisions on certain issues. Concluding his review, Magnano recommended it to anyone with either an interest in Hindu ritual or in interdisciplinary research.

Press reviews
Willis' book was reviewed by journalist T. Satyamurthy in one of India's largest newspapers, The Hindu. In an article entitled "Epigraphical study on Hindu rites", Satyamurthy remarked that Willis' scholarship "stands out brilliantly" throughout the text, arguing that on the whole the book represents a "very erudite work". Believing works of this quality were rare, Satyamurthy praised the use of references and footnotes and the "new treatment" of the textual and epigraphic records.

See also 

 Añjali Mudrā
 Buddhist prayer beads
 Coconut: use for worship
 Culture of India
 Dhupa
 Guru-shishya tradition
 Hindu prayer beads
 Hindu temple
 Indian honorifics
 Mala
 List of Hindu festivals, many of which involve Puja
 Mudras
 Namaste
 Panchalinga Darshana
 Pranāma
 Puja (Buddhism)
 Puja (Hinduism)
 Pādodaka
 Satyanarayan Puja

References

Footnotes

Bibliography

 
 
 
 
 
 

2009 non-fiction books
Academic studies of ritual and magic
Archaeology books
Cambridge University Press books